Holmes (formerly Holmes Camp, and also known as Holmes Flat) is an unincorporated community in Humboldt County, California.

A post office operated at Holmes from 1910 to 1965. Holmes was named for a lumber company executive.

References

Unincorporated communities in Humboldt County, California
Unincorporated communities in California